is a Tendai Buddhist temple in Kunisaki, Ōita Prefecture, Japan. It is located on the slopes of Mount Futago, the highest mountain on the Kunisaki Peninsula. The temple was established in 718 by Ninmon and became the central temple of Rokugō-Manzan (六郷満山).

The temple precincts are a Prefectural Historic Site included within a Special Zone of the Setonaikai National Park.

Treasures
 Seated wooden statue of Amida Nyorai (late Kamakura period) (Prefectural Cultural Property)
 Stone tō (Kamakura period) (Prefectural Cultural Property)
 Pair of wooden masks (1618, 1770) (Prefectural Cultural Property)
 Stone tō (Nanbokuchō/Muromachi period) (City Cultural Property)
 Stone tō (1468) (City Cultural Property)
 Stone tō (Muromachi period) (City Cultural Property)
 Stone Niō (1814), 245 and 230 cm (City Cultural Property)
 Wooden statue of Jūichimen Kannon
 Wooden statue of Fudō Myōō
 Raigō painting

See also
 Fuki-ji
 Maki Ōdō
 Kumano magaibutsu

References

External links 
  
 Kunisaki Tourist Association information
 Map of Setonaikai National Park 

Buddhist temples in Oita Prefecture
Tendai temples
8th-century establishments in Japan
Religious buildings and structures completed in 718